Ferocactus robustus is a barrel cactus in the genus Ferocactus of the family Cacteae.

Distribution
Ferocactus robustus is widespread in the states of Puebla and Veracruz in Mexico.

Description
This plant is  spherical to club-shaped and has eight sharp-edged ribs.

The fruits are spherical, fleshy, yellow, 2 to 3 inches long.

References

External links

 Biolib: Ferocactus robustus

robustus
Cacti of Mexico
Endemic flora of Mexico
Flora of Puebla
Flora of Veracruz